Driedorf is a municipality in the Lahn-Dill-Kreis in Hesse, Germany.

Geography

Location
Driedorf lies from 416 to 642 m above sea level on a tableland in the high Westerwald.

Mademühlen
Mademühlen has about 1,000 inhabitants and lies in the "Hessischer Westerwald" protected area and in the European protected area network Natura 2000. It is on the upper reaches of the Rehbach, between two reservoirs.

Münchhausen
Münchhausen is the first village on the Ulmbach and is blessed with extensive woodlands, which afforded prosperity in earlier times.

Neighbouring communities
Driedorf borders in the north on the community of Breitscheid, in the east on the town of Herborn, in the south on the community of Greifenstein (all in the Lahn-Dill-Kreis), and in the west on the communities of Oberrod, Rehe, Homberg, Waigandshain, Nister-Möhrendorf and Willingen (all in the Westerwaldkreis in Rhineland-Palatinate).

Constituent communities
Besides the namesake centre, there are eight other centres in Driedorf named Mademühlen, Roth, Waldaubach, Münchhausen, Hohenroth, Heisterberg, Heiligenborn and Seilhofen.

History
Driedorf had its first documentary mention in 1124.

The greater community of Driedorf came into being in three stages as part of Hesse's municipal reforms in the 1970s. On 1 October 1971, the communities of Driedorf, Heisterberg, Hohenroth, and Heiligenborn united, and three months later, on 1 January 1972, Münchhausen followed. Five years to the day later, on 1 January 1977, Seilhofen, Waldaubach, Mademühlen and Roth were amalgamated with Driedorf by state law.

Mademühlen
This village's namesake was a row of mills (Mühlen = "mills" in German) that for centuries stood along the upper reaches of the Rehbach. About 1800, it had a special mention in a description as being a rich farming village. The local poet Adolf Weiß (1861–1938) was from Mademühlen, and a memorial to him may still be visited today.

Münchhausen
The name Münchhausen makes it clear that it was founded by monks (Mönche = "monk" in German). Up until the beginning of the last century, in the church's eyes at least, it consisted of two places separated from each other by the Ulmbach. In 1989, Münchhausen celebrated 750 years of existence.

Politics

Mayors
1977–1995: Friedhelm Kessler, who had been mayor of Driedorf before amalgamation
1996–2007: Wolfgang Schuster (SPD)
2007–2010: Wolfgang Kühn (SPD)
2010–2016: Dirk Hardt (SPD)
2016–incumbent: Carsten Braun (CDU)

Municipal council

The municipal elections on 26 March 2006 yielded the following results:

Note: FWG is a citizens' coalition.

Economy and infrastructure
For a few years, the Westerwald's wind has been being used to generate electricity. Driedorf has 17 windfarms, 6 in Mademühlen, and the others distributed among the other centres which all together generate 13 GWh, amounting to 40% of the community's needs. Wind energy has reduced the yearly CO2 output by about 7 000 t. The community, however, does not wish for any further windfarms.

Sightseeing
There are two lakes in Driedorf, the Stausee Driedorf, a man-made lake for flood control and hydroelectric generation between Driedorf (main town) and Mademühlen, and the Heisterberger Weiher just outside Heisterberg to the southeast. Also nearby is the Krombach Reservoir, also used for flood control and hydroelectric generation, which straddles the Hesse-Rhineland-Palatinate border.

Noteworthy is the Evangelical Church on the Rehbach in Mademühlen. Built in the 11th century, it is Driedorf's oldest building.

References

External links
  
 Mademühlen

Lahn-Dill-Kreis